Filur (also Romanized as Fīlūr) is a village in Jowzdan Rural District, in the Central District of Najafabad County, Isfahan Province, Iran.

At the 2006 census, its population was 935, in 213 families.

References 

Populated places in Najafabad County